Flufenacet is an oxyacetanilide herbicide applied before crops have emerged.

In the model plant Arabidopsis thaliana it causes similar symptoms to the fiddlehead mutant.

References

External links
 

Herbicides
Thiadiazoles
Trifluoromethyl compounds
Anilides
Fluoroarenes